Pina Cei (born Giuseppina Casini; 13 June 1904 – 1 February 2000) was an Italian stage, film and television actress. She appeared in more than thirty films from 1933 to 1995.

Life and career 
The daughter of the stage actress Luisa Cei, she made her theatrical debut in 1922, in the company of Raffaele Niccoli. She later worked in several high-profile stage companies, including Emma Gramatica's and Ruggero Ruggeri's, until 1942, when she founded her own stage company. She made her film debut in 1933, in Villafranca, in which she is credited as Pia Torriani (from her husband's surname). Her younger sister Dory was also an actress.

Filmography

References

External links
 

1904 births
2000 deaths
People from San Juan, Puerto Rico
Italian film actresses
Italian television actresses
Italian stage actresses
20th-century Italian actresses